Cantagalo, formerly spelled Cantagallo, is a city located in the east-central area of Rio de Janeiro State, Brazil. The population is 20,168 (2020 est.) in an area of 749 km2.

History
Colonization of Cantagalo began in 1755, when Portuguese nobleman Manoel Henriques, Duke of Terso and a clandestine gold miner, left the state of Minas Gerais in search of unexplored riches. It was originally known as  after the nearby Macacu River.

By 1784, the settlement had grown to accommodate approximately 200 houses. This growth caught the attention of the Portuguese rulers of Brazil, who had a monopoly over gold exploration in the colony. By order of the Viceroy Luiz de Vasconcelos e Souza, several expeditions were sent in search of Henriques and his group. The town's current name (Portuguese for "rooster crow") was inspired by the circumstances of his capture. A troop was about to return to their camp after a day of searching in vain around the woods, when a soldier heard the crowing of a rooster nearby and decided to further explore the area. One of Henriques's men was found in a clearing in the woods and, in exchange for his release, revealed the whereabouts of the rest of the group. Henriques was deported to Africa in dishonour.

By 1786, the settlement's name had been officially changed from Sertões de Macacu to Cantagalo. In 1814, Cantagalo was officially recognized by Emperor Pedro I as a municipality and in October 1857, was officially elevated to the category of city. By the mid-19th century, the area's gold was played out and the settlement came to depend on agriculture. Corn, coffee, and sugarcane plantations covered several acres of highly fertile land.

Before the First World War, Cantagallo was considered a rich fruit- and coffee-producing district and was connected to Rio via a 100-mile-long eponymous railway.

Nowadays, the city's economic activities still revolve around agriculture, with the exploration of granite and calcareous rock for the cement industry also playing a strong role. Some of the largest cement manufacturers in Brazil have facilities in Cantagalo.

Notable residents
The financial journalist Jose Carlos Rodrigues was the son of a coffee planter of Cantagallo, and born there in 1844.
Brazilian writer Euclides da Cunha, was born in Cantagalo on January 15, 1886. One of the city's districts is named Euclidelândia, in his homage. Brazilian football player Jairo Da Silva, was born in Cantagalo, Rio de Janeiro. He is the most notable football player of the town. Now he is playing in Pafos FC.

Notes

References

External links
City's official website

Municipalities in Rio de Janeiro (state)